Stockbridge is a town in Calumet County, Wisconsin. The population was 1,456 at the time of the 2010 census. The village of Stockbridge, and the unincorporated communities of Kloten, Quinney, and Saint Catherines Bay are located within the town.

Geography
Stockbridge is in western Calumet County, on the eastern shore of Lake Winnebago. The village of Stockbridge is slightly north of the center of the town.

Demographics
As of the census of 2000, there were 1,383 people, 506 households, and 392 families residing in the town. The population density was 41.1 people per square mile (15.9/km2). There were 614 housing units at an average density of 18.3 per square mile (7.1/km2). The racial makeup of the town was 97.18% White, 0.36% Black or African American, 0.65% Native American, 0.80% Asian, 0.07% Pacific Islander, 0.14% from other races, and 0.80% from two or more races. 1.08% of the population were Hispanic or Latino of any race.

There were 506 households, out of which 33.8% had children under the age of 18 living with them, 70.0% were married couples living together, 2.8% had a female householder with no husband present, and 22.5% were non-families. 18.6% of all households were made up of individuals, and 7.9% had someone living alone who was 65 years of age or older. The average household size was 2.73 and the average family size was 3.12.

In the town, the population was spread out, with 25.7% under the age of 18, 7.0% from 18 to 24, 27.3% from 25 to 44, 27.0% from 45 to 64, and 13.0% who were 65 years of age or older. The median age was 40 years. For every 100 females, there were 110.5 males. For every 100 females age 18 and over, there were 114.6 males.

The median income for a household in the town was $55,096, and the median income for a family was $57,768. Males had a median income of $36,447 versus $27,350 for females. The per capita income for the town was $22,392. About 1.7% of families and 2.4% of the population were below the poverty line, including none of those under age 18 and 7.3% of those age 65 or over.

Notable people 

 William Reader, member of the Wisconsin State Assembly
 Ty Bodden, member of the Wisconsin State Assembly

References

External links 
 
 

Towns in Calumet County, Wisconsin
Towns in Wisconsin